Karaar is a Marathi feature film directed by Manoj Kotian, and starring Subodh Bhave, Urmila Kothare, Kranti Redkar, Suhasini Mule, and Aarti More. The songs from the film are sung by Avdhoot Gupte, Shreya Ghoshal, Bela Shende, Sonu Kakkar, Jasraj Joshi, Neha Rajpal and Vaishali Samant. In today's competitive world people are working hard for proving themselves, they are losing their emotional values in the relation of love, the film takes a look at what happens when people begin to live their lives on the basis of formal agreements registered in courts.

Cast 

 Subodh Bhave
 Urmila Kanitkar
 Kranti Redkar
 Suhasini Mule
 Aarti More

Soundtrack

References  

2010s Marathi-language films